Monowar Hossain (born 10 July 1984 in Khulna, Bangladesh), is a first-class cricketer who has represented Barisal Division, Khulna Division and Chittagong Division since making his debut in the 2008–09 Bangladeshi cricket season.

Notes

1984 births
Living people
Bangladeshi cricketers
Barisal Division cricketers
Chittagong Division cricketers
Khulna Division cricketers